Gosselin is a surname. Notable people with the surname include:

 Constance Gosselin (1793-?), French ballet dancer, sister of Geneviève
 David Gosselin (born 1977), Canadian ice hockey player
 Derrick Gosselin (born 1956), Belgian engineer
 Geneviève Gosselin (1791–1818), French ballet dancer, the first ballerina who raised on pointes
 Jean-François Gosselin (born 1975), Canadian politician
 Jon Gosselin (born 1977), American television personality
 Gosselin sextuplets, issue from Jon and Kate
 Juliette Gosselin (born 1991), Canadian actress
 Kate Gosselin (born 1975), American television personality
 Mario Gosselin (hockey player) (born 1963), Canadian ice hockey player
 Mario Gosselin (racecar driver) (born 1971), Canadian  racecar driver
 Martin Gosselin (1847–1905), British diplomat 
 Nathalie Gosselin (born 1966), Canadian judoka
 Nicholas Gosselin (died 1917), British military officer and intelligence agent
 Phil Gosselin, baseball player
 Robert Gosselin (born 1951), American politician
 Simon Gosselin (born 1988), French-Canadian drag queen
 Théodore Gosselin aka G. Lenotre (1855–1935), French historian
 YaYa Gosselin (born 2009), American actress

See also
 Gosling, a similar-sounding English surname

Surnames of Norman origin